Yalutorovsky District  is an administrative district (raion), one of the twenty-two in Tyumen Oblast, Russia. Within the framework of municipal divisions, it is incorporated as Yalutorovsky Municipal District. It is located in the west of the oblast. Its administrative center is the town of Yalutorovsk (which is not administratively a part of the district). Population: 14,461 (2010 Census);

Administrative and municipal status
Within the framework of administrative divisions, Yalutorovsky District is one of the twenty-two in the oblast. The town of Yalutorovsk serves as its administrative center, despite being incorporated separately as an administrative unit with the status equal to that of the districts.

As a municipal division, the district is incorporated as Yalutorovsky Municipal District. The Town of Yalutorovsk is incorporated separately from the district as Yalutorovsk Urban Okrug.

References

Notes

Sources

Districts of Tyumen Oblast
